CISD-FM was a community radio station in Iroquois, Ontario, Canada. The station was operated by Seaway Campus Community Radio Ltd., a division of the region's Seaway District High School.

CISD ceased operations in 2003.

References

Isd
Isd
Isd
Radio stations disestablished in 2003
2003 establishments in Ontario

ISD-FM